Hans-Joachim Lück (born 22 June 1953) is a German rower who competed for East Germany in the 1976 Summer Olympics.

He was born in Stralsund. In 1976 he was a crew member of the East German boat which won the gold medal in the eight event.

References

1953 births
Living people
Olympic rowers of East Germany
Rowers at the 1976 Summer Olympics
Olympic gold medalists for East Germany
Olympic medalists in rowing
East German male rowers
Medalists at the 1976 Summer Olympics
World Rowing Championships medalists for East Germany
People from Stralsund
Sportspeople from Mecklenburg-Western Pomerania